This article summarizes the highlights of professional and amateur golf in the year 2022.

Men's professional golf

Major championships 

 7–10 April: Masters Tournament – Scottie Scheffler won three strokes ahead of Rory McIlroy. It was his first Masters Championship victory, and his first major championship victory. He is one of three players who had won the Masters at 25 years of age or younger over the last 40 years.
 19–22 May: PGA Championship – Justin Thomas won in a 3-hole playoff against Will Zalatoris. It was his second PGA Championship victory, and his second overall major championship victory. Out of 22 players who have won multiple PGA Championships, Thomas was only the fifth player to win the event twice before turning 30.
 16–19 June: U.S. Open – Matt Fitzpatrick won by one shot over Scottie Scheffler and Will Zalatoris. It was his first major victory and first overall victory in his PGA Tour career. Fitzpatrick is the 13th golfer to win both the U.S Amateur and the U.S. Open in his career, and only the second golfer to win both on the same course.
 14–17 July: The Open Championship – Cameron Smith won by one stroke over Cameron Young. It was his first Open Championship victory, and his first major victory. Smith was only the third golfer to score 64 or lower in the final round of the event.

World Golf Championships 

 23–27 March: WGC-Dell Technologies Match Play – Scottie Scheffler defeated Kevin Kisner, 4 and 3, in the championship match. It was his first ever WGC victory, and this win granted him World Number One by the Official World Golf Ranking.
 27–30 October: WGC-HSBC Champions – Cancelled

The WGC-Workday Championship and WGC-FedEx St. Jude Invitational both lost its designation in World Golf Championships after 2021.

FedEx Cup playoff events 

 11–14 August: FedEx St. Jude Championship – Will Zalatoris defeated Sepp Straka in a 3-hole playoff. It was his first PGA Tour win and first ever FedEx Cup playoff event victory in his career.
 18–21 August: BMW Championship – Patrick Cantlay won by one stroke over Scott Stallings. It was his second back-to-back win at the event and third FedEx Cup playoff event victory in his career. Cantlay became the first player to win the BMW Championship in consecutive years ever since the FedEx Cup began in 2007. No one else had accomplished this feat with any other playoff events.
 25–28 August: Tour Championship – Rory McIlroy won by one stroke over Im Sung-jae and Scottie Scheffler. It was his sixth FedEx Cup playoff event victory, third FedEx Cup title, and third Tour Championship victory.

The Northern Trust was renamed to the FedEx St. Jude Championship after the 2020-21 PGA Tour season due to the WGC-FedEx St. Jude Invitational moving into the PGA Tour after the event lost its designation in WGC.

Other leading PGA Tour events 

 10–13 March: The Players Championship – Cameron Smith won by one stroke over Anirban Lahiri. It was his first Players Championship victory.

For a complete list of PGA Tour results see 2021–22 PGA Tour.

Leading European Tour events 

 8–11 September: BMW PGA Championship – Shane Lowry won by 1 stroke over Rory McIlroy and Jon Rahm. It was his second European Tour Rolex Series victory and first BMW PGA Championship win.
 17–20 November: DP World Tour Championship, Dubai – Jon Rahm won by 2 strokes over Alex Noren and Tyrrell Hatton. It was his third DP World Tour Championship win and ninth DP World Tour win.

For a complete list of European Tour results see 2022 European Tour.

Team events 

 18–24 April: Zurich Classic of New Orleans – Patrick Cantlay and Xander Schauffele defeated Sam Burns and Billy Horschel by two strokes.
 22–25 Sep: Presidents Cup – The U.S. team won, 17½–12½, for the ninth straight time.

Tour leaders 

 PGA Tour
 FedEx Cup –  Rory McIlroy
 Most wins –  Scottie Scheffler (4)
 Leading money winner –  Scottie Scheffler (record)
 European Tour –  Rory McIlroy (4,754 points)
 Japan Golf Tour –  Kazuki Higa
 Asian Tour – 
 2020–21–22 season:  Tom Kim
 2022 season:  Sihwan Kim
 PGA Tour of Australasia –
 2021–22 season:  Jediah Morgan
 2022–23 season: TBD
 Sunshine Tour –
 2021–22 season:  Shaun Norris
 2022–23 season: TBD

Awards 

 PGA Tour
 PGA Player of the Year –  Cameron Smith
 Player of the Year (Jack Nicklaus Trophy) –  Scottie Scheffler
 Vardon Trophy –  Rory McIlroy
 Byron Nelson Award –  Rory McIlroy
 Rookie of the Year (Arnold Palmer Award) –  Cameron Young
 Payne Stewart Award –   Billy Andrade
 European Tour
 Golfer of the Year – TBD
 Rookie of the Year –  Thriston Lawrence
 Korn Ferry Tour
 Player of the Year –  Justin Suh

Results from other tours 

 2020–21–22 Asian Tour
 2022 Asian Tour
 2021–22 PGA Tour of Australasia
 2022–23 PGA Tour of Australasia
 2022 PGA Tour Canada
 2022 Challenge Tour
 2022 Japan Golf Tour
 2022 PGA Tour Latinoamérica
 2021–22 Sunshine Tour
 2022–23 Sunshine Tour
 2022 Korn Ferry Tour

Other happenings 

 1 Jan: Jon Rahm remains World Number 1 in accordance to the Official World Golf Ranking. He has stayed at this spot since July 2021.
 28 Mar: Scottie Scheffler gains the top spot in the Official World Golf Ranking, obtaining it for the first time, after winning the 2022 WGC-Dell Technologies Match Play tournament.
 24 Oct: Rory McIlroy takes the top spot from Scottie Scheffler after winning the CJ Cup tournament.

Women's professional golf

LPGA majors 

 31 March – 3 April: Chevron Championship – Jennifer Kupcho won by two strokes over Jessica Korda. It was her first major victory and first overall win in her LPGA career. Kupcho is the seventh player to claim her first LPGA Tour title in an event that started in 1972 and became a major in 1983.
 2–5 June: U.S. Women's Open – Minjee Lee won by four strokes over Mina Harigae. It was her first U.S. Women's Open victory, and second overall major win in her LPGA career.
 23–26 June: KPMG Women's PGA Championship – Chun In-gee won by one stroke over Minjee Lee. It was her third major win, and first KPMG Women's PGA Championship victory in her LPGA career. She is the third player from South Korea to win at least three majors.
 21–24 July: The Evian Championship – Brooke Henderson won by one stroke over Sophie Schubert. It was her second major victory, and first Evian Championship win. Henderson is the first Canadian golfer, male or female, to win multiple major titles.
 4–7 August: Women's British Open – Ashleigh Buhai defeated Chun In-gee in a playoff by one stroke. It was her first major win, and first overall win in her LPGA career. Buhai is the third South African golfer to win a Women's British Open at Muirfield.

Additional LPGA Tour events 

 17–20 November: CME Group Tour Championship – Lydia Ko won by two strokes over Leona Maguire. It was her second CME Group Tour Championship win.

For a complete list of LPGA Tour results, see 2022 LPGA Tour.

For a complete list of Ladies European Tour results see 2022 Ladies European Tour.

Team events 

 13–16 July: Dow Great Lakes Bay Invitational – Lizette Salas and Jennifer Kupcho won by five strokes over Matilda Castren and Kelly Tan.

Money list leaders 

 LPGA Tour –  Lydia Ko
 Ladies European Tour –  Linn Grant (3,625 points)
 LPGA of Japan Tour –   Miyū Yamashita
 LPGA of Korea Tour –  Park Min-ji
 ALPG Tour –
 Epson Tour –  Linnea Ström

The Symetra Tour was renamed to the Epson Tour after the 2021 season.

Other tour results 

 2022 ALPG Tour
 2022 LPGA of Japan Tour
 2022 LPGA of Korea Tour
 2022 Epson Tour

Other happenings 

 1 Jan – Nelly Korda remains World Number 1, continuing her lead from 2021.
 31 Jan – Jin Young Ko gains the top spot in the Official Women's World Golf Ranking.

Senior men's professional golf

Senior majors 

 12–15 May: Regions Tradition – Steve Stricker won by 6 strokes over Pádraig Harrington. It was his fourth senior major victory, and second Regions Traditions win in his PGA Tour Champions career. This win was a wire-to-wire victory.
 26–29 May: KitchenAid Senior PGA Championship – Steven Alker won by 3 strokes over Stephen Ames. It was his first senior major win, and first KitchenAid Senior PGA Championship win in his Champions career.
 23–26 June: U.S. Senior Open – Pádraig Harrington won by 1 stroke over Steve Stricker. It was his first senior major win, and first overall victory in his Champions career. Harrington is the third straight player to win the U.S. Senior Open in his debut.
 7–10 July: Bridgestone Senior Players Championship – Jerry Kelly won by 2 strokes over Steve Stricker. It was his second senior major victory, and second Bridgestone Senior Players Championship victory in his Champions career.
 21–24 July: The Senior Open Championship – Darren Clarke won by 1 stroke over Pádraig Harrington. It was his first senior major victory, and first Senior Open Championship win.

Charles Schwab Cup playoff events 

 21–23 October: Dominion Charity Classic –  Steven Alker won by 1 stroke over K. J. Choi. It was his first Charles Schwab Cup event win in his Champions career.
 4–6 November: TimberTech Championship – Bernhard Langer won by 6 strokes over Thongchai Jaidee and Paul Goydos. It was his fourth Charles Schwab Cup playoff event victory and 44th PGA Tour Champions win.
 10–13 November: Charles Schwab Cup Championship – Pádraig Harrington won by 7 strokes over Alex Čejka. It was his fourth PGA Tour Champions victory.

Full results 

 2022 PGA Tour Champions season
 2022 European Senior Tour

Senior women's professional golf 

 22–24 July: Senior LPGA Championship – Karrie Webb won by 4 strokes over Annika Sörenstam.
 25–28 August: U.S. Senior Women's Open – Jill McGill won by 1 stroke over Leta Lindley.

Amateur golf 

 20–23 January: Latin America Amateur Championship – Aaron Jarvis won by 1 stroke over Mateo Fernández de Oliveira, Vicente Marzilio, Fred Biondi, and Santiago De la Fuente.
 20–25 May: NCAA Division I Women's Golf Championships – Rose Zhang (Stanford) took the individual title and the Cardinals captured their second team title.
 27 May – 1 June: NCAA Division I Men's Golf Championships – Gordon Sargent (Vanderbilt) took the individual title and the Longhorns captured their fourth team title.
 10–12 June: Curtis Cup – The United States team won, 15½–4½.
 15–18 June: The Amateur Championship – Aldrich Potgieter defeated Sam Bairstow, 3 and 2, in the final.
 22–25 June: The Womens Amateur Championship – Jess Baker of England defeated Louise Rydqvist of Sweden, 4 and 3, in the final.
 22–25 June: European Amateur – Filippo Celli of Italy won by 1 stroke over Rasmus Neergaard-Petersen of Denmark.
 20–23 July: European Ladies Amateur Championship – Savannah De Bock of Belgium won in a playoff against Charlotte Heath of England.
 8–14 August: U.S. Women's Amateur – Saki Baba of Japan defeated Monet Chun of Canada, 11 and 9, in the final.
 15–21 August: U.S. Amateur – Sam Bennett defeated Ben Carr, 1 up, in the final.
 24–27 August: Espirito Santo Trophy – The Sweden team won for the third time, besting the United States team in a tiebreaker.
 31 August – 3 September: Eisenhower Trophy – Italy won its first Eisenhower Trophy by one stroke over Sweden.
 27–30 October: Asia-Pacific Amateur Championship – TBD

Golf in multi-sport events

Deaths

January 

 9 January – Bob Shearer (born 1948), Australian professional golfer and course architect who had one win on the PGA Tour.
 19 January – Bob Goalby (born 1929), American professional golfer who had 11 wins on the PGA Tour including one Masters Tournament victory.
 24 January – Tomoo Ishii (born 1923), Japanese professional golfer.
 28 January – Elis Svärd (born 1996), Swedish professional golfer who had one win on the Nordic Golf League.

February 

 13 February – Eduardo Romero (born 1954), Argentine professional golfer who won over 80 professional golf tournaments across 5 or more tours, and was mayor of Villa Allende from 2015 until his death.
 19 February – Kyi Hla Han (born 1961), Burmese professional golfer who had one win in the Asian Tour and in the PGA Tour of Australasia. He served as executive chairman of the Asian Tour from 2006 until his death.

March 

 7 March – Ramón Báez Romano (born 1929), Dominican golfer, businessman, and politician.
 15 March – Lu Liang-Huan (born 1936), Taiwanese golfer who had 8 victories on the Japan Golf Tour.
 27 March – Joan Joyce (born 1940), American professional golfer who also played several other sports.

April 

 12 April – Shirley Spork (born 1927), American professional golfer and co-founder of the LPGA Tour.
 14 April – Jack Newton (born 1950), Australian professional golfer who had 1 victory on the PGA Tour.
 23 April – Sheila Vaughan (born 1942), English amateur golfer.

May 

 3 May – Bert Weaver (born 1932), American professional golfer who had 1 victory on the PGA Tour.
 28 May – Mary Everard (born 1942), English amateur golfer.
 31 May – Bart Bryant (born 1962), American professional golfer who had 3 victories on the PGA Tour including the Tour Championship in which he beat Tiger Woods by 6 strokes.

June 

 16 June – Don Allen (born 1937–1938), American amateur golfer.

July 

 1 July – Angela Bonallack (born 1937), English amateur golfer.
 4 July – Mac McLendon (born 1945), American professional golfer who had 4 victories on the PGA Tour.
 6 July – Dale Douglass (born 1936), American professional golfer who had 3 victories on the PGA Tour and 11 wins including one senior major on the PGA Tour Champions.
 9 July – Tommy Jacobs (born 1935), American professional golfer who had 4 victories on the PGA Tour.

August 

 19 August – David Marsh (born 1934), British amateur golfer. He served as the Chairman of Everton F.C. from 1991 to 1994.
 20 August – Tom Weiskopf (born 1942), American professional golfer who had 16 victories including one major win on the PGA Tour.

September 

 21 September – Russell Weir (born 1951), Scottish golfer.

October 

 2 October – Shirley Englehorn (born 1940), American professional golfer who won 11 LPGA Tour tournaments, including one major.
 9 October – Margie Masters (born 1934), Australian professional golfer who won one LPGA Tour tournament.
 13 October – Peter Butler (born 1932), English professional golfer who won several tournaments in Europe.

November 

 4 November – Dow Finsterwald (born 1929), American professional golfer who had 11 victories on the PGA Tour, including one major.

December 

 23 December – Ed Updegraff (born 1922), American amateur golfer and urologist.
 24 December – Kathy Whitworth (born 1939), American professional golfer who had 88 victories on the LPGA Tour.
 31 December – Barry Lane (born 1960), English professional golfer who had 5 victories on the European Tour.

Table of results 
This table summarizes all the results referred to above in date order.

Notes

References

External links

Men's tours' official sites 

 PGA Tour (and portal to Champions and Korn Ferry Tours)
 European Tour (and portal to European Senior and Challenge Tours)
 Japan Golf Tour  (English version)
 Asian Tour
 PGA Tour of Australasia
 Sunshine Tour

Women's tours' official sites 

 LPGA Tour
 Ladies European Tour
 Epson Tour

Rankings 

 Official World Golf Ranking – updated each Monday
 Women's World Rankings – updated each Monday
 World Amateur Golf Rankings – updated each Wednesday

 
2022